Tel Shimron (Hebrew: תל שמרון‎) is an archaeological site and nature reserve in the Jezreel Valley.

Shimron was the name of a major city in the north of Israel throughout antiquity. It is mentioned in the Bible by this name, and in other period sources as Shim'on. In late antiquity, it was known by the name Simonias (Hebrew: סימונייה‎). The city is identified with Tell Samunia, also written Samunieh.

Tel Shimron is located northeast of modern moshav Nahalal on the western edge of the Nazareth range, on the border between the Lower Galilee and the Jezreel Valley. Its location at the intersection of the lower Galilee ranges and the Jezreel Valley as well as its proximity to the Acco Plain made it and important part of trade routes through the area.

Surveys and excavations

1982 Survey 
In 1982 the site was surveyed by Yuval Portugali and Avner Raban. The finds included several tombs dating to the Middle Bronze II, Persian, Hellenistic, and Roman Periods, but Chalcolithic and Early Bronze I remains were discovered around the site, as well as evidence of Neolithic activity in the surrounding area.

Israel Antiquities Authority excavations 
In the years spanning 2004, 2008, and 2010, salvage archaeological excavations were conducted immediately adjacent to Tel Shimron by Nurit Feig and Yardenna Alexandre on behalf of the Israel Antiquities Authority (IAA).

2004 Excavation 
Nurit Feig directed a salvage excavation on behalf of the IAA prior to the installation of electrical poles at the Bet Zarzir-Nahalal Junction road. Four squares were excavated, three of which were situated along the shoulder of the road, and the fourth was 200m to the west.

2008 Excavation 
Feig conducted another IAA salvage excavation prior to the construction of agricultural buildings. This excavation resulted in limited finds, such as several smaller walls and potsherds dating to the Early and Middle Bronze Ages as well as the Roman Period. Flint remains dated to the Neolithic as well as the Early Bronze Age.

2010 Excavation 
Another salvage excavation was conducted on behalf of the IAA, this time by Yardenna Alexandre. The excavation was conducted near the Nahalal junction before a widening of Road 75. There was evidence of limited occupation during the EB and Intermediate Bronze, but a rural settlement during the Middle Bronze age was uncovered. Limited Roman remains were discovered as well.

Tel Shimron Excavations 
In 2016, Tel Shimron Excavations began research on the tel itself.  The project is co-directed by Daniel M. Master and Mario A. S. Martin on behalf of the Institute of Archaeology at Tel Aviv University and Wheaton College, IL. The initial survey in 2016 reached similar conclusions to the earlier work by Portugali and Raban. Middle Bronze Age remains were found close to the surface, and later periods were mostly represented at the center of the mound; however, ground penetrating radar magnetometry assays revealed strata from later periods overlaying the MB strata in certain areas, which led to the excavations of 2017 and 2019.

The first two years of excavation were uncovered remains from the Middle Bronze Age, Iron Age, Persian Period, Hellenistic Period, and Roman Period. 

Tel Shimron Excavations continued the dig in 2021, continuing the work of previous years.

History and archaeology

Neolithic 
Very little Neolithic material has been found at Tel Shimron, but during the 2010 excavation, a PPNB arrowhead as well as remains of the Wadi Rabah culture were discovered.

Chalcolithic 
Sparse evidence of the Ghassulian Culture of the Chalcolithic period was uncovered during the 2010 Excavation.

Early Bronze Age 
Due to Middle Bronze remains that lie atop the Early Bronze strata, it is difficult to gain a detailed picture of the Early Bronze Age at Shimron. Surveys have suggested the site was first settled in the EB I, and there was a gap in settlement during the EB III.

Middle Bronze Age
Tel Shimron was at its largest, 19.5 hectares, during the Middle Bronze Age. The site is mentioned in the MB I Execration Texts, and its size and location suggest that it was an important inland city in the interconnected trade network of growing ports and the Jezreel Valley trade route. A cylinder seal found, dating to the MB II, further attests the international nature of Shimron as a site along an important trade route during the MB. In general, Shimron is part of a larger trend of booming urbanism and fortification as well as international trade during the MB.

In the southwest corner of the site, Middle Bronze Age domestic buildings were excavated. Evidence of daily life in the Middle Bronze Age was found in the houses, including craft industries like metal working.

On the acropolis of the site, to the east, monumental Middle Bronze Age remains were discovered. While the pottery in this area is similar chronologically to that of the lower city domestic area, the quality and forms are different. For example, several whole and fragmented Nahariya Lamps were found. The juxtaposition of the domestic activity in the lower city and the monumental buildings on the acropolis provide an interesting case to study status difference in the Middle Bronze age.

The cylinder seal, which dates to the 17th century BCE, or the Middle Bronze Age II, was discovered at Tel Shimron during the 2017 season. Made of hematite in the Old Syrian Classic style, it measures 1.5 cm in length and 8.5 cm in width with a 2.5 mm diameter hole. The seal depicts a sphinx and lion fighting over a human and stag, with two vultures, a sun and crescent shape depicted over the fight. In addition, a hare and a bull’s head are pictured to either side. The depictions draw from influences from Egypt, Mesopotamia, and Northern Syria, showing the international nature of the 17th Century.

Late Bronze Age 
While surveys indicate that Shimron shrunk somewhat in the middle of the second millennium, the Amarna Letters attest that it was still an important royal city in Northern Canaan. In EA 225 EA 261, and EA 224, Šammu-Hadi, king of Shimron, is shown as a vassal to Pharaoh. EA 224 seems to indicate that part of the local economy of Shimron is grain production, some of which would go to support nearby Egyptian garrisons; however, EA 8 indicates otherwise. Burraburiyash of Babylon complains to the Pharaoh that Šum-Hadda, most likely the same ruler of Shimron mentioned in the other letters, and Sutana of Acco raided one of his caravans. This text not only indicates the location of Shimron along an important trade route, but its alliances with western powers like Acco, which is supported by Cypriot material found at the site.

Iron Age 
Iron Age remains were found in a Silo cut into the Bronze Age fortifications. While the 2019 excavation did not allow for rigorous investigation of the Iron Age remains, the assemblage found in the Silo is similar to that of Megiddo VI, which indicates a “Canaanite” population in the lowlands in the Iron Age I. A bronze bracelet and electrum sheeting were also found here.

The exact political and social orientation of Tel Shimron during the Iron Age is unclear. According to Joshua 11, the king of Shimron was part of an alliance with the king of Hazor, which was defeated by Joshua. Shimron is part of the allotment belonging to the Tribe of Zebulun in Joshua 19:15.

During the 8th Century, it is possible that Shimron was destroyed by Tiglath Pileser III. In a fragment of Tiglath Pileser III’s Annals, different cities taken by the Assyrians are recorded. One such site, although the list is badly broken, has been restored as Samhuna, which Nadav Na’aman and others have associated with Shimron.

Persian period
Tiglath Pileser III performed massive deportations in the Jezreel and Lower Galilee during the 8th century, and surveys in the area suggest it remained sparsely populated for centuries.  In the Persian period, however, occupation resumed. The 2004 salvage excavation uncovered a Persian Period building that likely served a public function, which could indicate that Shimron had an administrative role in the area.

Hellenistic period
Finds from the Hellenistic period indicate substantial occupation during both the Ptolemaic and Seleucid eras. It is unclear, however, if the site was occupied after the withdrawal of Seleucid rule in the middle of the second century.

Feig’s 2008 excavation uncovered a coin, which was likely struck in the Ashkelon Mint during the Ptolemaic Period.

Excavations on the western side of the site revealed a hoard of coins from the reign of Antiochus III, just at the moment when this region moved from Ptolemaic to Seleucid rule. There were also coins of Demetrius II; after which the site was abandoned.

Roman period
The city during the First Jewish–Roman War, and in 66 CE a battle occurred here between the Jewish rebels and the Romans, who besieged the city. Josephus, mentioning the village by name, states that he was attacked there at night by the Roman decurion, Æbutius, who had been entrusted with the charge of the Great Plain and who had one-hundred horse and two-hundred infantry at his disposal. The Roman soldiers, however, were forced to withdraw since their horses were of little use in that terrain (Life of Flavius Josephus, § 24).

During this era, Shimron was referred to as Simonias in Greek and Simonia in Rabbinic Hebrew and Aramaic, but the Palestinian Talmud draws equivalency between the two, declaring “and Shimron is Simonia.”

The surveys by Raban and Feig indicate occupation during the Roman period, but the site was likely part of the orbit of nearby Sepphoris. Part of the Leggio-Sepphoris road was excavated at Shimron in 2004, and proximity to this trade route probably benefitted Shimron. Wall 302, another massive ashlar wall, was also uncovered in 2004, and it dates to the same period.

In the center of the site, several houses, dating to the 1st to 3rd Centuries CE, were excavated in 2017. Both houses had entrance courtyards, and the rooms were divided by stone walls with ‘windows.’ These domestic structures were typical of Jewish Galilean villages in the Roman Period, including a miqveh bath found in one of the houses.

Muslim period
There is little textual evidence of Shimron during the Early Muslim period, so Portugali’s survey provides the best picture of the site during this period to date. Portugali identified two distinct settlements, a 3.9 dunam farmstead, showing a retraction from the 78.3 dunam Byzantine settlement, and a 12.8 dunam Mamluk village, which Portugali hypothesized was built over a crusader occupation.

Later, Shimron is mentioned by Ishtori Haparchi ("Kaftor wa-Feraḥ", ch. xi, written in 1322).

A map from Napoleon's invasion of 1799 by Pierre Jacotin showed a village here, named  Sammouni.  In 1838, Edward Robinson found here a small Arab village called Semunieh,  and he noted it again in 1852.

In 1867, a group of German Templers attempted to establish an early German Templer Colony in Palestine on the site, which failed due to malaria.

In 1875, Victor Guérin visited the place and noted:

"The present village has succeeded a small ancient city, now completely destroyed. East of the site which it occupied rises a round isolated hill, which commands the plain in every direction, and was once surrounded on its summit by a wall, of which a few traces still remain. This hill must probably have been fortified. Scarped towards the east, it slopes gently on the western side towards the town, which covered the lower hillocks at its feet. Among them I found, in the midst of the various debris which cover the soil, the remains of a building in cut stone, completely overthrown, once ornamented by columns, as is attested by two mutilated shafts lying on the spot. This edifice seems to have been constructed from east to west, so that it may have been a Christian church.

"In another place I saw an enclosure measuring thirty-five paces in length by twenty-five in breadth. From a distance it appears ancient. It is, however, of modern date, constructed of stones of all sizes and shapes ; among them pillars of broken sarcophagi".

In 1881, the PEF's Survey of Western Palestine (SWP)  described it as a small village on a knoll with three springs, having probably less than 100 inhabitants. A population list from about 1887 showed that  Semunieh had about  100 inhabitants; all Muslims.

Gottlieb Schumacher, as part of surveying for the construction of the Jezreel Valley railway, noted in 1900 that the village "had not increased [since the 1881 SWP survey]  due to its unhealthy position and bad water. The proprietor, Sursock, built a number of dwellings covered with tile masonry."

British Mandate period
The area was acquired by the Jewish community as part of the Sursock Purchase. In 1936, the site became an agricultural training station for the Moshavim Movement. One group that trained here came from Nahalal, and continued on to establish kibbutz Hanita.

In 1948, kibbutz Timorim was established on the site. Timorim became a moshav shitufi in 1953 and moved to the south of the country, due to lack of farming lands. When it was vacated, it became a Ma'abara (transit camp) for new immigrants destined for Migdal Ha'Emek and Ramat Yishai.

Nature reserve
In 1965, a 28-dunam nature reserve was declared, preserving the Apple-ring Acacia (syn. Acacia albida) trees that grow on the site. This is the northernmost occurrence of these trees in Israel. The Apple-ring Acacia, native to Africa and the Middle East, is used for nitrogen fixation, erosion control for crops, for food, drink and medicine. It sheds its leaves in the rainy season and is highly valued in agroforestry as it can grow among field crops without shading them.

References

Bibliography

 

 
 ("personal name" p. 115)

External links
Survey of Western Palestine, Map 5: IAA, Wikimedia commons  

Archaeological sites in Israel
Nature reserves in Israel
Amarna letters locations
Canaanite cities
Ancient Jewish settlements of Galilee
Biblical geography
Pre-Pottery Neolithic B
Ghassulian